Lawrence University is a private liberal arts college and conservatory of music in Appleton, Wisconsin. Founded in 1847, its first classes were held on November 12, 1849. Lawrence was the second college in the U.S. to be founded as a coeducational institution. (The first was long-vanished New York Central College.)

History
Lawrence's first president, William Harkness Sampson, founded the school with Henry R. Colman, using $10,000 provided by philanthropist Amos Adams Lawrence, and matched by the Methodist church. Both founders were ordained Methodist ministers, but Lawrence was Episcopalian. The school was originally named Lawrence Institute of Wisconsin in its 1847 charter from the Wisconsin Territorial Legislature, but the name was changed to Lawrence University before classes began in November 1849.  Its oldest extant building, Main Hall, was built in 1853. Lawrence University was the second coeducational institution in the country.

Lawrence's first period of major growth came during the thirty-year tenure (1894―1924) of alumnus Samuel G. Plantz as president, when the student body quadrupled, from 200 to 800.

From 1913 until 1964, it was named Lawrence College, to emphasize its small size and liberal arts education focus. The name returned to Lawrence University when it merged with Milwaukee-Downer College. The state of Wisconsin then purchased the Milwaukee-Downer property and buildings to expand the campus of the University of Wisconsin–Milwaukee. Initially, the university designated two entities: Lawrence College for Men and Downer College for Women. This separation has not lasted in any material form, though degrees are still conferred "on the recommendation of the Faculty of Lawrence and Downer Colleges" and the university by-laws still make the distinction.

During World War II, Lawrence College was one of 131 colleges and universities in the nation that took part in the V-12 Navy College Training Program, which offered students a path to a Navy commission.

The Lawrence Conservatory of Music, usually referred to as "the Con", was founded in 1874.  Lawrence offers three degrees: a Bachelor of Artsa Bachelor of Music and a Bachelor of Musical Arts. It also offers a five-year dual degree program, where students can receive both B.A. and B.Mus. degrees.

Freshman Studies at Lawrence is a mandatory two-term class, in which all students study the same selected 11 classic works of literature, art, and music, the list varying from year to year. President Nathan M. Pusey is credited with initiating the program in 1945, although Professor Waples chaired the Freshman Studies Committee and was responsible for implementing the program. The program continues to this day, despite being temporarily suspended in 1975.

In 2005, LU initiated a capital campaign called "More Light!", which aimed at raising $150 million. By October 2011 the college had raised $160,272,839, with the conclusion event held on October 28, 2011. In January of 2014, LU embarked on a new capital campaign called "Be The Light!". Upon the conclusion of the campaign on December 31, 2020, more than $232,613,052 had been raised in total toward four campaign priorities: Lawrence Fund, Full Speed to Full Need, Student Journey, and Campus Renewal.

Lawrence University is part of the Oberlin Group, a consortium of liberal arts college libraries.

Milwaukee-Downer traditions

The traditions and heritage of Milwaukee-Downer are woven into the Appleton campus, from the grove of hawthorn trees (called Hawthornden) between Brokaw and Colman halls, to the sundial on the back of Main Hall, to the bestowing upon each class a class color and banner.

The Lawrence Dean of Women was referred to as the "Dean of Downer", but when the offices of Dean of Men and Dean of Women were merged to form the Dean of Students, the substantive duties of the "Dean of Downer" came to an end; the title is still borne by a senior female professor, but her only duty is to carry the Downer Mace in academic processions. For many years the women's choir was called the Downer Chorus.  At one time the BA was conferred upon women in the name of "Downer College of Lawrence University" and upon men in the name of "Lawrence College of Lawrence University"; now all B.A. degrees are conferred in the name of "Lawrence & Downer Colleges of Lawrence University." (The B.Mus. degree is from "the Lawrence University Conservatory of Music.)

Presidents

University presidents
 1849–1853 William Harkness Sampson, principal
 1853–1859 Edward Cooke, president
 1859–1865 Russell Zelotes Mason, president
 1865–1879 George McKendree Steele, president
 1879–1889 Elias DeWitt Huntley, president
 1883–1889 Bradford Paul Raymond, president
 1889–1893 Charles Wesley Gallagher, president
 1893–1894 L. Wesley Underwood, acting president
 1894–1924 Samuel G. Plantz, president
 1925–1937 Henry Merritt Wriston, president
 1937–1943 Thomas Nichols Barrows, president
 1944–1953 Nathan Marsh Pusey, president
 1954–1963 Douglas Maitland Knight, president
 1963–1969 Curtis William Tarr, president
 1969–1979 Thomas S. Smith, president
 1979–2004 Richard Warch, president
 2004–2013 Jill Beck, president
 2013–2021 Mark Burstein, president
 2021–present Laurie Carter, president

Presidents of Milwaukee-Downer College
 1895–1921 Ellen Sabin
 1921–1951 Lucia Russell Briggs
 1951–1964 John Johnson

Academics

Lawrence University operates on a trimester calendar. The academic year runs from mid-September to mid-June. The student/faculty ratio at Lawrence is 9:1. 

The college offers majors in most of the liberal arts. The school also offers the option of interdisciplinary areas of study and allows students to design their own majors. Lawrence grants Bachelor of Arts and Bachelor of Music degrees, with a double degree possible. Lawrence offers a number of cooperative degree programs in areas such as engineering, health sciences and environmental studies. Its most popular majors, by 2021 graduates, were:
Music Performance (35)
Psychology (23)
English Language & Literature (20)
Econometrics & Quantitative Economics (20)
Biology/Biological Sciences (17)
Music Teacher Education (15)
History (15)

All students are required to take First-Year Studies during their first two trimesters, which introduces students to broad areas of study and provides a common academic experience for the college. Known as Freshman Studies until 2021, the program was established in 1945, and aside from a brief interruption in the mid-1970s it has remained a consistent fixture of the school's liberal arts curriculum. Lawrence's First-Year Studies program focuses on a mixture of Great Books and more contemporary, influential works, which include non-fiction books, fiction books, and various other types of works, such as paintings, photographs, musical recordings, and even the periodic table of the elements. Readings are replaced every few years, with the exception of Plato's Republic, which has been included on the list since 1945.

Conservatory of Music
The Lawrence University Conservatory of Music was founded in 1874 and has been a part of Lawrence University ever since. The Conservatory offers Bachelor of Music degrees in Performance, Theory/Composition, Music Education, and a five-year double degree option that grants both a BM degree from the Conservatory and a BA degree from the College.  Approximately 25% of the Lawrence student body, or 350 students, is in the Conservatory. The Conservatory has three choirs, two bands, two jazz ensembles, a symphony orchestra, an improvisation collective, five world music ensembles, and numerous chamber music groups.  Students take about 2/3 of their classes in Music and about 1/3 in other subjects for the B.Mus., and the reverse for B.A. in Music.

The Conservatory offers also a Bachelor of Musical Arts, primarily—but not exclusively—for students whose interest is in other than Western Classical Music; students take 3/4 of their classes in Music, and 1/4 in other subjects.

Academic affiliation 
Lawrence is a member of the Associated Colleges of the Midwest, an academic consortium of 14 liberal arts colleges in the Midwest and Colorado which coordinates several off-campus study programs in a large number of countries as its primary activity.

Campus 
The  campus is located in downtown Appleton, divided into two parts by the Fox River. The academic campus is on the north shore of the river, and the major athletic facilities (including the 5,000-seat Banta Bowl) are on the southeast shore. Lawrence also has a  northern estate called Björklunden (full name: Björklunden vid sjön), which serves as a site for retreats, seminars, concerts, and theatrical performances.  It contains a chapel for weddings.  Donald and Winifred Boynton of Highland Park, Illinois, donated the property in Door County to Lawrence in 1963.

Campus development
In the mid-1980s, the Physics Department built a $330,000 small laser laboratory (known as the "laser palace"), which includes 800 5 mW small lasers and more than 500 mirrors.

In 2009, Lawrence opened the Richard and Margot Warch Campus Center, a gathering place for students, faculty, staff, alumni, and guests from the Fox Cities community.  The  building is situated on the Fox River on the site of the former Hulburt House. The Warch Campus Center includes a cinema, campus dining services, campus mailboxes, and various meeting and event spaces. The building has earned a LEED Gold certification for meeting sustainability goals in energy conservation, environmental friendliness, and green building.

The college has a long history of razing buildings on its campus, because of the limited land available for constructing new buildings. Many buildings on campus are built on the site of former buildings. Some razed buildings include:
 Peabody Hall of Music (20th century)
 Hamar Union (1960)
 Underwood Observatory (1962)
 Alexander Gym I (1962)
 Carnegie Library (1964)
 Worcester Art Center (1987)
 Stephenson Hall of Science (1998)
 Hulbert House (2006) (new construction: Warch Campus Center, 2009)

Student body

Lawrence enrolls about 1,500 students who hail from nearly every U.S. state. The total enrollment in academic year 2010–11 was 1,566 students, the largest student body in Lawrence University's history. Over 75% of the students identify as white, about 12% are international students, and about 25% of students study in the conservatory of music.  In the fall of 2014, a quarter of the incoming class were domestic students of color.

Lawrence students have been named Rhodes Scholars seven times. Since 1976, 57 students and nine faculty have received Fulbright Scholarships. Since 1969, 73 students have been named Watson Fellows.

Student traditions
At the beginning of every academic year in September, incoming freshmen arrive a week before returning students to partake in Welcome Week. During Welcome Week, various activities are planned in order to help the incoming class get to know one another and to help them acclimate to college life. During the first night of Welcome Week, students and their parents attend the President's Welcome, which concludes with the traditional matriculation handshake, where every member of the incoming class shakes hands and exchanges words with the university's president.

During the fall term, the on-campus fraternity Beta Theta Pi hosts the annual Beach Bash. For this event, the brothers of ΒθΠ shovel approximately 14 tons of sand into the fraternity house basement, and install a boardwalk and a lifeguard station that doubles as a DJ booth.This tradition was skipped in 2020, due to the COVID-19 pandemic.

During spring term, Lawrence hosts a music festival, LU-aroo (a play on words on the popular music festival Bonnaroo). Held on the quad, the festival features many talented student bands, both from the college and the conservatory. In 2016, the musician The Tallest Man on Earth played at the festival.

Also during spring term, many seniors participate in the Senior Streak, which typically happens during the eighth week of the term. The goal of the senior streak is to provide seniors with one last opportunity to let loose before finals, graduation, and post-college life. Although rumor says that the senior streak was created as a result of former president Richard Warch's aversion to the activity, this has been proven to be false. Students, often coming from Lawrence's on-campus bar, the Viking Room, strip their clothes and run around the area of Main Hall, as one last hurrah before finals and graduation.

Media
The student newspaper, The Lawrentian, has been published for over a century.

Lawrence University hosts the Great Midwest Trivia Contest webcast every January over the college radio station WLFM.

Athletics

Lawrence University's intercollegiate athletic teams, known as the Vikings since 1926, compete in the Midwest Conference in National Collegiate Athletic Association (NCAA) Division III. Men's sports include baseball, basketball, cross country, fencing, football, golf, ice hockey, soccer, swimming & diving, tennis, and track & field; women's sports include basketball, cross country, fencing, golf, soccer, softball, swimming & diving, tennis, track & field, and volleyball.

In 2005–06, the men's basketball team was ranked first in Division III for much of the season, after starting the season unranked. The Vikings were the only undefeated team in all divisions of college basketball for the last six weeks of the season, ending with a record of 25–1. Star forward Chris Braier won the Josten's Award as the top player in the country for both playing ability and community service. Coach John Tharp was named Division III Midwest Coach of the Year. Beginning in 2004, Lawrence qualified for the Division III national tournament in five of the next six years (2004, 2005, 2006, 2008, 2009). Their best result was in 2004, advancing to the quarterfinals (Elite 8), but fell to eventual national champion Wisconsin–Stevens Point by a point in overtime at Tacoma, Washington.

In 2011, Lawrence's men's cross country team won the Midwest Conference championships for the first time since 1985, beating Grinnell College and ending its 14-year winning streak.

Recognition 
Lawrence was ranked 56th on the 2013 U.S. News: List of Best U.S. National Liberal Arts Colleges.

Notable faculty

 Warren Beck, fiction writer and Faulkner scholar
 William Chaney, historian
 Richard N. Current, historian
 William H. Riker, political scientist
 Charles B. Schudson, judge
 Fred Sturm, jazz composer and musician
 Arthur Thrall, artist
 Harry Dexter White, economist, first U.S. Director of IMF (1946–47), and Soviet informant
 John Holiday, opera singer, music professor, and finalist on season 19 of The Voice.
 Peter N. Peregrine, renowned anthropologist and archaeologist

Notable alumni

 

 James Sibree Anderson, Wisconsin State Representative
 Martha Bablitch, judge of the Wisconsin Court of Appeals
 John Miller Baer, 1909, Congressman from North Dakota
 William Baer, Assistant Attorney General for the Antitrust Division
 Melvin Baldwin, Congressman from Minnesota
 Charles A. Barnard, Wisconsin State Representative
 Sam Barry, college basketball and baseball coach (attended)
 Myrt Basing, NFL player
 Jennifer Baumgardner, 1992, feminist writer and activist
 Lisle Blackbourn, 1925, NFL head coach
 Champ Boettcher, NFL player
 Thomas Boyd, Wisconsin State Representative
 Alexander Brazeau, Wisconsin State Representative
 Webster E. Brown, Congressman from Wisconsin (attended)
 Bonnie Bryant, 1968, author of children's books
 Louis B. Butler Jr., 1973, associate justice of the Wisconsin Supreme Court
 Thomas Callaway, Actor and Interior Designer
 Robert A. Collins, Wisconsin State Representative
 Julia Colman (1828–1909), American temperance educator, activist, editor, writer
 Charles Rankin Deniston, Wisconsin State Representative
 James Dinsdale, Wisconsin State Representative
 William Diver, 1942, linguist and founder of the Columbia School of Linguistics
 Pawo Choyning Dorji, 2006, filmmaker and photographer
 William Draheim, Wisconsin State Senator
 Paul Driessen, 1970, author and lobbyist
 Dale Duesing, 1967, operatic baritone
 Siri Engberg, curator, Walker Art Center
 Cynthia Estlund, 1978, law professor and author
 Edna Ferber, author and playwright (attended)
 James A. Frear, Congressman from Wisconsin (attended)
 Earle W. Fricker, Wisconsin State Representative
 William Fuller, 1975, Poet and senior vice president and chief fiduciary officer of Northern Trust Corporation
 Dominic Fumusa, 1991, actor
 John Rankin Gamble, 1872, Congressman from South Dakota
 Robert J. Gamble, 1874, Congressman from South Dakota

 Ed Glick, NFL player (attended)
 Walter Samuel Goodland, governor of Wisconsin (attended)
 Suzanne Graff, actress
 Robert C. Greene, 1988, Founder of Starbobs Coffee
 Michael P. Hammond, 1954, chairman of the National Endowment for the Arts
 Lorena Hickok, confidante of Eleanor Roosevelt (attended)
 Earnest Hooton, 1903, physical anthropologist
 John D. Huber, Columbia University political scientist
 Thomas R. Hudd, Congressman from Wisconsin (attended)
 Frank W. Humphrey, 1881, Wisconsin State Representative
 Bruce Iglauer, founder of Alligator Records
 Lester Johnson, Congressman from Wisconsin
 Zachary Scot Johnson, 2001, singer-songwriter and creator of Thesongadayproject
 Jeffrey Jones, 1968, actor
 Kaja Kallas, 1999, Prime Minister of Estonia
 Scott Klug, 1975 former congressman from Wisconsin
 Peter Kolkay, bassoonist
 Eddie Kotal, National Football League player
 Takakazu Kuriyama, Japanese ambassador to the United States (attended)
 Barbara Lawton, 1987, Lieutenant Governor of Wisconsin
 Fred Lerdahl, 1965, composer and music theorist
 John A. Luke Jr., 1971, CEO of MeadWestvaco
 Harry N. MacLean, 1964, true crime author
 Momodu Maligie, 2004, Minister of Water Resources for Sierra Leone 
 William H. Markham, Wisconsin State Senator
 Gerry Max, author and Richard Halliburton scholar
 John McDonald, NFL player
 James H. McGillan, mayor of Green Bay, Wisconsin
 James Merrell, 1975, professor of history at Vassar College
 John S. Mills, U.S. Air Force major general
 Terry Moran, 1982, chief White House correspondent for ABC News
 David Mulford, 1969, United States Ambassador to India
 William F. Nash, Wisconsin State Senator
 George Allen Neeves, Wisconsin State Representative
 Tom Neff, 1975, CEO and founder of The Documentary Channel
 Justus Henry Nelson, missionary in the Amazon (attended)
 Garth Neustadter, 2011 Emmy winner, Outstanding Music Composition for a Series
 Angelia Thurston Newman, poet, author, lecturer
 Roger Nicoll, 1963, neuroscientist at UCSF
 Jessica Nelson North, 1917, author
 Arnold C. Otto, Wisconsin State Representative
 Rip Owens, NFL player (attended)
 Alice Peacock, 1992 singer-songwriter
 Charles Pettibone, Wisconsin State Senator
 Cindy Regal, 2001, experimental physicist
 Scott Reppert, 1983, member of the College Football Hall of Fame
 Eben Eugene Rexford, author of works on gardening (attended)
 Carl W. Riddick, member of the U.S. House of Representatives from the Second District of Montana
 Josh Sawyer, video game designer at Obsidian Entertainment
 Melvin H. Schlytter, Wisconsin State Representative
 Campbell Scott, 1983, actor
 Michael Shurtleff, 1942, casting director, author
 Eric Simonson, 1982, Oscar-winning writer–director
 Red Smith, 1926, MLB player, NFL player and assistant coach, head coach of the Georgetown Hoyas football team and Wisconsin Badgers football team, athletic director of Seton Hall University
 Janet Steiger, 1961, chairman of the Federal Trade Commission
 Thomas A. Steitz, 1962, Sterling Professor of Molecular Biophysics and Biochemistry at Yale University, 2009 Nobel Prize in Chemistry laureate
 Heidi Stober, 2000, operatic soprano
 Fred Sturm, 1973, jazz composer and arranger
 William T. Sullivan, Wisconsin State Representative
 Gladys Taber (1899–1980), author
 Anton R. Valukas, 1965, U.S. attorney, author of the Valukas Report
 Madhuri Vijay, 2009, novelist, author of The Far Field
 James Franklin Ware, 1871, legislator
 William Warner, U.S. Senator from Missouri (attended)
 Iva Bigelow Weaver, soprano and music educator based in Milwaukee
 Alexander B. Whitman, Wisconsin State Senator
 George W. Wolff, Wisconsin State Representative and Senator
 Tom Zoellner, 1991, author, journalist
 Al Zupek, 1944, NFL player

See also
 List of NCAA fencing schools

References

External links 
 
 

 
Educational institutions established in 1847
Liberal arts colleges in Wisconsin
Music schools in Wisconsin
Private universities and colleges in Wisconsin
Buildings and structures in Appleton, Wisconsin
Education in Outagamie County, Wisconsin
Tourist attractions in Outagamie County, Wisconsin
1847 establishments in Wisconsin Territory